The National Education, Health and Allied Workers' Union (NEHAWU) is a trade union in South Africa. With a membership of 235,000 it is the largest public sector union in the country. It organizes State, Health, Education and Welfare workers.

History
The union was founded in 1987, when the Health and Allied Workers' Union merged with the General and Allied Workers' Union and the South African Allied Workers' Union.

The NEHAWU is affiliated with the Congress of South African Trade Unions (COSATU), and Public Services International and the Trade Union International Public Service and Allied employees.

Leadership

General Secretaries
1987: Yure Mdyogolo
1988: Phillip Dexter
1994: Neil Thobejane
1998: Fikile Majola
2013: Bereng Soke
2017: Zola Saphetha

Presidents
1987: Bheki Mkhize
1990: Vusi Nhlapo
2004: Noluthando Mayende-Sibiya
2010: Mzwandile Makwayiba
2022: Mike Shingange

References
Notes

Sources

External links
 NEHAWU official site.

Trade unions based in Johannesburg
Congress of South African Trade Unions
Public Services International
Healthcare trade unions in South Africa
Education trade unions
World Federation of Trade Unions
Trade unions established in 1987
Trade unions in South Africa